Thomas Robert Way (1861 - 1913) was an English painter of landscapes and portraits, lithographer and printer, who exhibited in London between 1883 and 1893.

Way was born in London.  He trained at the South Kensington Art Schools and designed posters for London Underground between 1910 and 1913. T. R. Way's father, Thomas Way (1837–1915), was an lithographer, engraver and general printer who founded the firm Thomas Way and Son.

T. R. Way is noted for his topographical lithographs of London. His catalogue of 130 of James McNeill Whistler's lithographs appeared in 1896. At his (and his father's) urging Whistler took up lithography, and Way eventually published "Mr. Whistler's Lithographs" in 1905. Later, in 1912, he wrote a memoir as Whistler's friend and confidant, "Memories of James McNeill Whistler". He also printed the work of Frank Brangwyn.

Books of his lithographs
Mr. Whistler's Lithographs (1896); 2nd edition (1905)
Reliques of Old London (1896)
Later Reliques of Old London (1897)
Reliques of Old London Suburbs North of the Thames (1898)
Architectural Remains of Richmond, Twickenham, Kew, Petersham and Mortlake (1900)
Ancient Royal Palaces in and Near London (1902) - 24 full-page lithographs
Reliques of Stratford-on-Avon (1902)
The Ancient Halls of the City Guilds (1903)
The Art of James McNeill Whistler (1903)
Memories of James McNeill Whistler (1912)
Catalogue of an Exhibition of LIthographs by Whistler (1914)

References

External links

 
T R Way online (ArtCyclopedia)
Posters by T R Way (London Transport Museum)
Works by T R Way (Birmingham Museums and Art Gallery)

1861 births
1913 deaths
19th-century English painters
English male painters
20th-century English painters
Landscape artists
English lithographers
English graphic designers
Artists' Rifles soldiers
20th-century British printmakers
20th-century English male artists
19th-century English male artists
20th-century lithographers